Khinchital is a village in the Bhopal district of Madhya Pradesh, India. It is located in the Huzur tehsil and the Phanda block.

Demographics 

According to the 2011 census of India, Khinchital has 9 households. The effective literacy rate (i.e. the literacy rate of population excluding children aged 6 and below) is 55.88%.

References 

Villages in Huzur tehsil